Scopula rubrosignaria is a moth of the family Geometridae. It is found in Madagascar.

Subspecies
Scopula rubrosignaria rubrosignaria
Scopula rubrosignaria sanguinolenta Herbulot, 1972

References

Moths described in 1900
rubrosignaria
Moths of Madagascar
Moths of Africa